Morten Toft Olsen (born 11 October 1984) is a Danish handballer for GOG Håndbold.

He has previously played for Danish side clubs GOG and Viborg HK. He was released early from his contract with Saint-Raphaël Var Handball to rejoin TSV Hannover-Burgdorf whom he played for in the period 2010 to 2013. He has rejoined TSV Hannover-Burgdorf 1 July 2015 after a short term contract with Al Rayyan SC. Since 2020 he is back in Denmark playing for GOG. 

In 2021 he announced his retirement from the national team.

References

External links

1984 births
Living people
Danish male handball players
Olympic handball players of Denmark
Handball players at the 2016 Summer Olympics
Medalists at the 2016 Summer Olympics
Olympic gold medalists for Denmark
Olympic medalists in handball
Viborg HK players
Danish expatriate sportspeople in France
Danish expatriate sportspeople in Germany
Danish expatriate sportspeople in Qatar
Expatriate handball players
Handball-Bundesliga players
Handball players at the 2020 Summer Olympics
Medalists at the 2020 Summer Olympics
Olympic silver medalists for Denmark